The Horseshoe Canyon Formation is a stratigraphic unit of the Western Canada Sedimentary Basin in southwestern Alberta. It takes its name from Horseshoe Canyon, an area of badlands near Drumheller.

It is of Late Cretaceous age, Campanian to early Maastrichtian stage (Edmontonian Land-Mammal Age), and is composed of mudstone, sandstone, carbonaceous shales, and coal seams. A variety of depositional environments are represented in the succession, including floodplains, estuarine channels, and coal swamps, which have yielded a diversity of fossil material. Tidally-influenced estuarine point bar deposits are easily recognizable as Inclined Heterolithic Stratification (IHS). Brackish-water trace fossil assemblages occur within these bar deposits and demonstrate periodic incursion of marine waters into the estuaries.

The Horseshoe Canyon Formation crops out extensively in the area around Drumheller, as well as farther north along the Red Deer River near Trochu and along the North Saskatchewan River in Edmonton. It is overlain by the Battle, Whitemud, and Scollard formations. The Drumheller Coal Zone, located in the lower part of the Horseshoe Canyon Formation, was mined for sub-bituminous coal in the Drumheller area from 1911 to 1979, and the Atlas Coal Mine in Drumheller has been preserved as a National Historic Site.  In more recent times, the Horseshoe Canyon Formation has become a major target for coalbed methane (CBM) production.

Dinosaurs found in the Horseshoe Canyon Formation include Albertavenator, Albertosaurus, Anchiceratops, Anodontosaurus, Arrhinoceratops, Atrociraptor, Epichirostenotes, Edmontonia, Edmontosaurus, Hypacrosaurus, Ornithomimus, Pachyrhinosaurus, Parksosaurus, Saurolophus, and Struthiomimus. Other finds have included mammals such as Didelphodon coyi, non-dinosaur reptiles, amphibians, fish, marine and terrestrial invertebrates and plant fossils. Reptiles such as turtles and crocodilians are rare in the Horseshoe Canyon Formation, and this was thought to reflect the relatively cool climate which prevailed at the time.  A study by Quinney et al. (2013) however, showed that the decline in turtle diversity, which was previously attributed to climate, coincided instead with changes in soil drainage conditions, and was limited by aridity, landscape instability, and migratory barriers.

Oil/gas production
The Drumheller Coal Zone has been a primary coalbed methane target for industry. In the area between Bashaw and Rockyford, the Coal Zone lies at relatively shallow depths (about 300 metres) and is about 70 to 120 metres thick. It contains 10 to 20 metres of cumulative coal, in up to 20 or more individual thin seams interbedded with sandstone and shale, which combine to make an attractive multi-completion CBM drilling target. In total, it is estimated there are 14 trillion cubic metres (500 tcf) of gas in place in all the coal in Alberta.

Biostratigraphy
The timeline below follows work by David A. Eberth and Sandra L. Kamo published in 2019.

Dinosaurs

Ankylosaurs

Maniraptors

Marginocephalians

Ornithomimids

Hadrosaurs and thescelosaurs

Tyrannosaurs

Other Animals

Mammals

Other Reptiles

Fish

See also 

 List of dinosaur-bearing rock formations

References

Bibliography 
 Makovicky, P. J., 2001, A Montanoceratops cerorhynchus (Dinosauria: Ceratopsia)  braincase from the Horseshoe Canyon Formation of Alberta: In: Mesozoic Vertebrate Life, edited by Tanke, D. H., and Carpenter, K., Indiana University Press,  pp. 243–262.
 Varricchio, D. J. 2001. Late Cretaceous oviraptorosaur (Theropoda) dinosaurs from Montana. pp. 42–57 in D. H. Tanke and K. Carpenter (eds.), Mesozoic Vertebrate Life. Indiana University Press, Indianapolis, Indiana. 
 Weishampel, David B.; Dodson, Peter; and Osmólska, Halszka (eds.): The Dinosauria, 2nd, Berkeley: University of California Press. 861 pp. .

Geologic formations of Alberta
Cretaceous Alberta
Maastrichtian Stage of North America
Upper Cretaceous Series of North America
Sandstone formations
Shale formations
Coal formations
Fluvial deposits
Tidal deposits
Reservoir rock formations
Source rock formations
Western Canadian Sedimentary Basin
Fossiliferous stratigraphic units of North America
Paleontology in Alberta